The Z 23000 was a type of railcar run by the Compagnie du chemin de fer métropolitain de Paris (CMP). The trains, better known during their 50 years of service as the "automotrices Z" (English: Z railcars), were brought in from 1934 to serve la Ligne de Sceaux in the southern suburbs of Paris, which had been modernized and electrified by 1937. The Z 23000 were built with identical motors and were the first generation of modern self-propelled locomotive technology engineered for the future regional metro network, which would not be created until forty years later under the name Reseau Express Regional (RER).

History 
In 1930, the CMP ordered the Z 23000, intended to be suitable for reliable and efficient suburban service on the Sceaux Line, which was being radically modernized and electrified at the time of the order. These new railcars introduced several new features, including four pairs of doors per side (similar to equipment used on the Paris Métro) allowing for faster passenger boarding at stations, high platform boarding, longer cars without significant gaps at curved platforms, light construction for faster acceleration and simple, reliable electrical equipment. The railcars were equipped with a pantograph for capturing the 1.5 kV DC power from overhead catenary lines.

The Z 23000 railcars were ordered in several installments: the first phase in 1934, built by the Forges et ateliers de constructions électriques de Jeumont company, followed by a second order in 1937, a third in 1942 and a fourth in June 1950. Similarly, the commercial implementation of the railcars was also rolled out in multiple phases between November 1937 and December 1938 (for the first two series) on the Sceaux Line which had just been modernised and electrified. Two final orders were placed in 1959 for 21 engines and in 1961 for a further 25. A total of 148 railcars were built over a period of almost 30 years.

The Z 23000 also played a part in the integration of the Sceaux and the RER B Lines in 1977, initially extending to Châtelet-Les Halles. They received some technical improvements at this time to accommodate the steeper gradients on the new tracks for the RER B. The line has a north-south ramp with a gradient of 40 per thousand. RATP engineers tested the railcars on the Line A ramp between Le Vésinet et Saint-Germain-en-Laye. The brakes needed replacing and the wheels were upgraded to monoblock (there were also some spoke wheels.) However the Z 23000, designed for a continuous 1500 V current, had limited functionality on the RER B because north of Gare du Nord the line was electrified using SNCF's incompatible 25 kV AC system. Because of this, the RATP ordered the MI 79 (French: Matériel d'Interconnexion de 1979, English: interconnection rolling stock of 1979) trainsets for the RER B, which could use both electric systems (interconnect).

Withdrawal 

Because of these issues, the Z 8100 (or MI 79) model was brought in. The RATP planned to withdraw the Z 23000 from service by 1983, but technical issues with the MS 61 (which would soon operate exclusively on the RER A) forced 24 trains of the then-new MI 79 to leave the RER B to make up for the shortfall. Withdrawal actually began in 1984, but the process was slowed down by a cold wave in 1985–86, which caused technical issues with the MI 79 fleet, forcing the surviving Z 23000 units to make up for the shortfall.

The last Z 23000 train ran on 27 February 1987, fifty years after the railcars were introduced on the Sceaux Line, from Gare du Nord to Orsay-Ville.

After its official withdrawal from service, two runs took place on the southern part of the line, in 1990 and 1994.

Order list

Preserved examples 

The Z 23461 is preserved in its original "duck blue" livery at the Cité du train museum in Mulhouse.

The RATP preserves five railcars in the Villeneuve-Saint-Georges reserve. Z 23237 has been restored into the "celtic green" livery, while Z 23342, Z 23312, Z 23326 and Z 23328 were preserved in the same blue and gray livery they had when they were retired.

Photo gallery

References

SNCF multiple units
Réseau Express Régional multiple units
Electric multiple units of France